Vulcănești is a town in Gagauzia, Moldova.

The area of Vulcănești is the southern exclave of Gagauzia surrounded by the Cahul District (Moldova) and Odessa Region (Ukraine).

One village-rail station also named Vulcănești, is administered by the city.

It was the site of an archaeological investigation, which found a Neolithic sculpture that echoes Rodin's The Thinker.

Media
 Vocea Basarabiei 106.7

See also
 Budjak
 Carbalia

References

Cities and towns in Moldova
Gagauzia